Petitcodiac  may refer to:

 Petitcodiac River, a river in the Canadian province of New Brunswick
 Petitcodiac, New Brunswick, a village in New Brunswick
 Petitcodiac (electoral district), a riding which elects members to the Legislative Assembly of New Brunswick